Philippe Vandevelde, working under the pseudonym Tome (24 February 1957 – 5 October 2019), was a Belgian comics writer. He was known for collaborations with Janry on Spirou et Fantasio and Le Petit Spirou, and with Luc Warnant and later Bruno Gazzotti on Soda. He also collaborated with Ralph Meyer on Berceuse assassine, and with Marc Hardy on Feux. Earlier in his career he was an assistant-artist for Dupa.

Biography 
Vandevelde was born in Brussels. An operation left him blind for a short while at the age of eight.  His first experiences of comics were the Adventures of Tintin story King Ottokar's Sceptre and Corentin read aloud to him. Under the pseudonyms "Phil" and "Tom", he published his first illustrations and comics for the school magazine Buck (made by Thierry Groensteen) from 1972 to 1974. His first comic was a medieval parody Estrel, le troubadour.

Tome began his professional comics career in the studio of Dupa, the author of Cubitus, where he met Janry who would become a long-time collaborator. After assisting Turk and De Groot on series such as Léonard and Clifton, they began working at the Franco-Belgian comics magazine Spirou in 1979, their first assignment being the games page Jeureka.

In 1980 they began work on their first Spirou et Fantasio adventure, the iconic forty-year-old series of Spirou. Previously created by a succession of authors including the famous André Franquin, Tome and Janry were given the task in alternation with another creative team of Nic and Cauvin. Eventually assuming sole responsibility of the series, Tome and Janry continued creating stories until 1998, completing 14 albums, in addition to creating Le Petit Spirou, a series about Spirou's youth, for which they made 14 albums since 1990.

Bibliography
Spirou et Fantasio
Le Petit Spirou
Soda
"Feux"
"Sur la Route de Selma"
"Berceuse Assassine"
"Les Minoukini"
"Le Gang Mazda"

Awards
 1992: Humour Award and Youth Award (9–12 years) at the Angoulême International Comics Festival, France
 2000: nominated for Best German-language Comic for Children and Young People at the Max & Moritz Prizes, Germany
 - nominated for the Best Scenario Award and the Youth Award (9–12 years) at the Angoulême International Comics Festival
 2002: nominated for Best International Writer at the Max & Moritz Prizes

Sources 

 Tome publications in Spirou BDoubliées 
 Tome albums Bedetheque 

Footnotes

External links 
 Tome biography on Lambiek Comiclopedia

1957 births
2019 deaths
Writers from Brussels
Belgian comics artists
Belgian comics writers
Belgian humorists
Spirou et Fantasio